Connecticut's 41st House of Representatives district elects one member of the Connecticut House of Representatives. It encompasses parts of Groton and New London. It has been represented by Democrat Joe de la Cruz since 2017.

Recent elections

2020

2018

2016

2014

2012

References

41